Nanostictis is a genus of lichen-forming fungi in the family Stictidaceae. The genus was circumscribed in 1954 by Danish lichenologist Mogens Skytte Christiansen, with Nanostictis peltigerae assigned as the type species.

Species
Nanostictis caucasica 
Nanostictis christiansenii 
Nanostictis confusa 
Nanostictis heterodermiae 
Nanostictis nephromatis 
Nanostictis peltigerae 
Nanostictis pluriseptata 
Nanostictis pseudocyphellariae 
Nanostictis stictae

References

Ostropales
Ostropales genera
Lichen genera
Taxa described in 1954